Valéria Cantuário da Silva (born 10 September 1998), simply known as Valéria, is a Brazilian footballer who plays as a forward or a winger for Portuguese club Benfica and the Brazil women's national team.

Club career
Valéria has played for AE São Paulo, SE Tiradentes, Grêmio Osasco Audax EC, EC Vitória and São Paulo FC in Brazil and for Madrid CFF in Spain.

International career
Valéria represented Brazil at the 2018 FIFA U-20 Women's World Cup. She made her senior debut on 28 November 2020.

References

1998 births
Living people
People from Teresina
Brazilian women's footballers
Women's association football forwards
Women's association football wingers
Madrid CFF players
Primera División (women) players
Brazil women's international footballers
Brazilian expatriate women's footballers
Brazilian expatriate sportspeople in Spain
Expatriate women's footballers in Spain
São Paulo FC (women) players
S.L. Benfica (women) footballers
Sportspeople from Piauí